Qaleh Juq (also Romanized as Qal‘eh Jūq) is a village in Qaleh Darrehsi Rural District, in the Central District of Maku County, West Azerbaijan Province, Iran. At the 2006 census, its population was 696, in 170 families.

References 

Populated places in Maku County